Lerwick is the main town and port of the Shetland archipelago, Scotland. Shetland's only burgh, Lerwick had a population of about 7,000 residents in 2010.

One of the UK's coastal weather stations is situated there, with the local climate having small seasonal variation due to the maritime influence. Being located further north than Saint Petersburg and the three mainland Nordic capitals, Lerwick's nights in the middle of summer only get dark twilight and winters have below six hours of complete daylight.

History
Lerwick is a name with roots in Old Norse and its local descendant, Norn, which was spoken in Shetland until the mid-19th century. The name "Lerwick" means bay of clay. Towns with similar names exist in southwestern Norway and on the Faroe Islands. 

Evidence of human settlement in the Lerwick area dates back to the Neolithic (4000–2500 BC) and the Bronze Age (2500–800 BC) known from paleoenvironmental records for human activity and the recovery of artefacts, including a stone axe head submerged in Bressay Sound. Iron Age (800 BC – AD 800) settlement is known at the Broch of Clickimin, which was constructed as early as 400 BC. The first settlement to be known as Lerwick was founded in the 17th century as a herring and white fish seaport to trade with the Dutch fishing fleet. This settlement was on the mainland (west) side of Bressay Sound, a natural harbour with south and north entrances between the Shetland mainland and the island of Bressay. Its collection of wooden huts was burned to the ground twice: once in the 17th century by the residents of Scalloway on the western side of Mainland, then the capital of Shetland, who disapproved of the immoral and drunken activities of the assembled fishermen and sailors; again in 1702 by the French fleet.

Fort Charlotte was built in the mid 17th century on Lerwick's waterfront, and permanent stone-built buildings began to be erected around the fort and along the shoreline. The principal concentration of buildings was in the "lanes" area: a steep hillside stretching from the shoreline to Hillhead at the top. Lerwick became capital of the Shetland Islands in 1708, taking over the function from Scalloway. The civil parish of Lerwick had been in 1701 created from a small part of the parish of Tingwall, to which Scalloway still belongs. When Lerwick became more prosperous through sea trade and the fishing industry during the 19th century, the town expanded in 1891 to the west of Hillhead, thereby including the former civil parishes of Gulberwick and Quarff, as well as the islands parish of Burra. Lerwick Town Hall was built during this period of expansion.

Lerwick war memorial dates from 1923 and was designed by Sir Robert Lorimer. The next period of significant expansion was during the North Sea oil boom of the 1970s when large housing developments were built to the north of Staney Hill (located in Lerwick) and to the south (Nederdale and Sandveien).

Climate

Lerwick has transitioned from a subpolar oceanic climate (Cfc) to a maritime climate (Cfb) with cool to cold temperatures all year long. The lack of trees reflects the latter type. This is particularly pronounced by virtue of Lerwick being on the coast of an island, so even extreme temperature records are subdued; the record high stands at just  (July 1991) and the record low just  (January 1952 and January 1959). Lerwick is also a very cloudy town, averaging only 1,110 sunshine hours annually. In August, the warmest month, average high temperatures are near . This produces an extremely narrow difference for an area north of the 60 parallel. Snowfall can occur, primarily from December to March, but snow accumulation is rarely heavy and usually short-lived. The exposed North Atlantic location and proximity to autumn and winter storm tracks means high winds are a regular occurrence, alongside high levels of cloudiness and precipitation.

Owing to its northerly location, winter months are extremely dark in Lerwick. On the day of the winter solstice it gets only 5 hours and 49 minutes of daylight. In sharp contrast daylight lasts 18 hours and 55 minutes on the day of the summer solstice. As a result, nights never get completely dark for a period of time in summer, with dark blue elements remaining in the sky. The maritime influence tempers the climate effects of these swings in daylight, but in many areas of the world this latitude has hostile winters. Farther north in the world, only the Faroe Islands have such high January averages as Lerwick and fellow Shetland station at Baltasound – with the warm Atlantic currents preventing ice formation. Only when temperatures in continental areas are record cold does Lerwick experience some cold as was the case in December 2010 during the severe cold wave affecting the British Isles and Europe that covered much of mainland UK in snow. Even so, average highs remained above  and frosts were light.

Demography
Lerwick has 6,958 residents, as of 2011. It is 97.0% White (83.3% White Scottish, 8.9% White Other British, 2.6% White Other, 1.4% White Polish, 0.8% White Irish), 2.2% Asian or Asian Scottish or British Asian, and 0.8% other ethnic groups. Lerwick's residents are 2.5% unemployed, 17.3% are part-time employees, and 50.3% are full-time employees.

Industry and economy
Lerwick is a busy fishing and ferry port. The harbour also services vessels supporting the offshore oil industry.

Power supply

Main power supply is from Lerwick Power Station located in Gremista.

Notable buildings

Significant buildings in Lerwick include Fort Charlotte, Lerwick Town Hall, the Böd of Gremista, Shetland Museum and Broch of Clickimin.

Because of the historic nature of the area, some scenes from BBC's Shetland were filmed in Lerwick.

Transportation
Lerwick is served by the Tingwall Airport located a few miles away and Sumburgh Airport that is further south and flies all year to some Scotland destinations.

NorthLink Ferries operate a daily overnight ferry service  between Lerwick and Aberdeen, regularly calling in to Kirkwall in the Orkney Islands.

The Shetland Islands Council operate a ro-ro ferry service to Out Skerries and Bressay from a terminal in the centre of the town.

The local bus service is provided by the Regional Transport Partnership (ZetTrans) and operated by a number of different local bus service operators. The town has a bus station, Viking bus station.

Schools and education
Lerwick's secondary school is Anderson High School.

Shetland College, a constituent partner institution of the University of the Highlands and Islands, is also based in the town, offering degree-level education (along with further education courses) to locals who may have difficulty travelling further afield to study.

Hospitals and healthcare
The Gilbert Bain Hospital provides secondary care services to all of Shetland. The Montfield Hospital, a few hundred metres away, is an older hospital than the Gilbert Bain, but has become a secondary health care service for the people of Lerwick over time.

Sport
The town is home to four football teams, Lerwick Spurs, Lerwick Thistle, Lerwick Celtic and Lerwick Rangers.

Media
Local independent radio station SIBC broadcasts daily from a studio in Market Street. BBC Radio Shetland, a BBC Radio Scotland regional opt out, has its studios in Pitt Lane. The Shetland Times, a weekly local newspaper, has its premises in Gremista on the northern outskirts of Lerwick. Millgaet Media Group, a multi-media production company, is based at the North Ness Business Park.

Culture
Lerwick has strong ties with Scandinavian countries, particularly Norway (Lerwick has a friendship agreement with Måløy in Norway).

Events
Lerwick is the focus of most events in Shetland, including the largest of the annual Up Helly Aa fire festivals which takes place on the last Tuesday of January every year.

Places of worship
There are several churches in Lerwick, including:
 Adam Clarke Memorial Methodist Church (a congregation of the Methodist Church of Great Britain).
 Baptist Church, Clairmont Place.
 St. Columba's Church – one of three buildings of Lerwick and Bressay Parish Church (part of the Church of Scotland).
 St. Magnus' Church, Greenfield Place (part of the Scottish Episcopal Church).
 St. Margaret's Roman Catholic Church.

In the 19th century there were more churches in Lerwick, including a Free Church on South Hill Head.

Gallery

See also
 Leirvik – a town in the island of Stord in Norway.
 Leirvík – a village in the island of Eysturoy, Faroe Islands.
 Leirvik, in the county of Sogn og Fjordane, Norway.
 Lervik - a village in the municipality of Fredrikstad, Norway.
 Lervik - a hamlet in Skåne County, Sweden.

Notes and references
References

Notes

External links

 
 Lerwick tourist profile published by the Shetland Islands Council
 Shetland in Statistics, published by the Shetland Islands Council in 2006 

 
Populated places established in the 17th century
Ports and harbours of Scotland
Port cities and towns in Scotland
Port cities and towns of the North Sea
Fishing communities in Scotland
County towns in Scotland
Towns on Scottish islands
17th-century establishments in Scotland
Populated places in Shetland
Parishes of Shetland
Mainland, Shetland
Towns in Shetland